The 12 Division is an division of the Sri Lanka Army. Based at the Hambantota, it is responsible for the maintenance of capability for the defence of the Port of Hambantota. It is also responsible for carrying out training and administrative work. It was established 4 February 2011.

External links
12 DIV

Sri Lanka Army divisions
Military units and formations established in 2011